The Long Island AVA is an American Viticultural Area encompassing Nassau and Suffolk counties of New York, including the smaller offshore islands in those counties.  The AVA was established in 2001, over 15 years after two smaller AVAs were created at the eastern end of Long Island.  The Long Island AVA designation was promoted as a benefit for some wineries located just outside the two smaller AVAs and for wineries that wanted to create wines that use blends from vineyards in different parts of the island. It was also developed and promoted as a consumer protection of the Long Island name, as AVAs require that at least 85% of the fruit used in the designated wine is grown within the borders of the region. The "Long Island" AVA was authored by veteran Long Island winemaker Richard Olsen-Harbich who also authored "The Hamptons, Long Island" and "North Fork of Long Island" AVAs in the mid-1980s.

Vineyards on Long Island benefit from the moderating influence of the Atlantic Ocean, Long Island Sound, and Peconic Bay on the local climate. The region is located in hardiness zones 7a and 7b.

References

External links
Long Island Wineries

American Viticultural Areas
AVA
Geography of Nassau County, New York
New York (state) wine
Geography of Suffolk County, New York
2001 establishments in New York (state)